Seán Byrne (16 May 1937 – 5 March 2018) was an Irish Fianna Fáil politician.

Early career
A farmer before entering politics, he was unsuccessful on the first two occasions when he stood for election to Dáil Éireann, as a Fianna Fáil candidate in the Tipperary South constituency at the 1977 and 1981 general elections. He finally won a seat there at the February 1982 general election, and was re-elected at the November 1982 general election. At the 1987 general election he lost his seat to his Fianna Fáil colleague Noel Davern.

However, in the subsequent elections to the 18th Seanad Byrne was elected by the Cultural and Educational Panel. He did not contest the 1989 general election, but was re-elected to the 19th Seanad. In the 1992 general election he stood again in Tipperary South, but was not elected. He was defeated in the 1993 election to the 20th Seanad, but was instead nominated by the Taoiseach, Albert Reynolds.

Seanad
He contested the 1997 Seanad election on the Administrative Panel, but failed to win a seat and did not stand again.

Death
On 5 March 2018, he died after a long illness. Fianna Fáil leader Micheál Martin said, "The Fianna Fáil organisation, locally in Tipperary and nationally, has lost a loyal and valued member and supporter."

References

1937 births
2018 deaths
Local councillors in South Tipperary
Fianna Fáil TDs
Members of the 23rd Dáil
Members of the 24th Dáil
Members of the 18th Seanad
Members of the 19th Seanad
Members of the 20th Seanad
Irish farmers
Politicians from County Tipperary
Nominated members of Seanad Éireann
Fianna Fáil senators